The 2011 Famous Idaho Potato Bowl, the 15th edition of the game, was a post-season American college football bowl game, held on December 17, 2011 at Bronco Stadium on the campus of Boise State University in Boise, Idaho as part of the 2011–12 NCAA Bowl season.

This was the first year the game was known as the Famous Idaho Potato Bowl. The game was known as the Humanitarian Bowl in 2010.

The game, which was telecast at 3:30 p.m. MT on ESPN, featured the Utah State Aggies from the Western Athletic Conference (WAC), and the Ohio Bobcats from the Mid-American Conference.

Utah State accepted a bid to compete in the 2011 edition of the game on November 28, with Ohio accepting the other bid on December 4.

Teams

Utah State

On November 28, 2011, the Utah State Aggies accepted an invite to represent the WAC. The Aggies entered the bowl with a record of 7–5, their first winning season since 1996. One notable game from Utah State's season was against defending national champions Auburn, where they nearly upset the Tigers 38-42. The 2011 Famous Idaho Potato Bowl marked the first appearance in a bowl game for Utah State since the game's very first incarnation as the 1997 Humanitarian Bowl. The Aggies were looking for their first bowl win since the 1993 Las Vegas Bowl. Utah State entered the game on a 5-game winning streak after starting 2-5.

Ohio

On December 4, 2011, the Ohio Bobcats accepted an invite to represent the MAC.  The Bobcats entered the bowl with a record of 9–4 and were the MAC-East division champions. However, they lost to NIU in the 2011 MAC Championship Game 20-23. The Famous Idaho Potato Bowl marked the third consecutive appearance in a bowl game for Ohio, following the 2009 Little Caesars Pizza Bowl and the 2010 New Orleans Bowl. The Bobcats hoped to win their first bowl game in school history.

The two teams had met before on September 17, 1994, when Utah State won 5-0 at Ohio.

Game summary
Utah State received the ball first and drove to the 1-yard line of Ohio. However, the Aggies were unable to convert to on a 4th down, turning the ball over to Ohio. On Ohio's first drive, quarterback Tyler Tettleton recovered his own fumble and ran to the back of his endzone for a safety. USU scored in again in the 1st quarter on a 3-yard touchdown pass from quarterback Adam Kennedy to go up 9-0. Ohio cut the lead to 2 in the second quarter when Tettleton completed a 26-yard pass to Derek Roback.

Ohio received the ball to start the second half, but had to punt the ball away after they were unable to get a first down. On the ensuing drive, Utah State's Michael Smith rushed for a 63-yard touchdown to go up 16-7. Ohio responded with a 32-yard field goal to make the score 16-10. However, Utah State went up 23-10 with another rushing touchdown from Michael Smith. Ohio was able to respond again with a 44-yard touchdown pass to LaVon Brazill to cut the deficit to 17-23.

The Aggies had a chance to end the game with possession at their own 7-yard line with 4:23 to go. However, Utah State had to punt the ball away with 2:21 left. The Bobcats were able to drive down the field and score on a 1-yard rush by Tettleton with 13 seconds remaining, going up 24-23 after the extra point. The Bobcats were able to hold to victory after the Aggies were unable to score on their final possession.

With the win, the Ohio Bobcats won their first bowl game in school history. The Bobcats also had their first 10-win season since 1968.

Scoring summary
Source.

Statistics

Referee call
This game was notable for a confusing set of explanations by referee Penn Wagers on the play that led to the game-winning touchdown.   The initial ruling on the field is that Ohio wide receiver LaVon Brazill had crossed the goal line for the touchdown on a reception from Tyler Tettleton.  But a replay review of the play was issued following the play to determine if Brazill was downed before getting the ball into the end zone.  After a first look, Wagers came out to confirm the touchdown, indicating that the evidence is clear that Brazill scored the touchdown.  But there was confusion as to the reason it was a touchdown.  It appeared that Brazill fumbled the ball and since he recovered his own fumble, that he is allowed to advance it making the score a touchdown.  After further discussion, Wagers came out and said:

However, after another review, the touchdown was reversed since Brazill was downed before getting the ball into the end zone.  Wagers then said:

Two plays later, Ohio scored the game-winning touchdown.

References

2011–12 NCAA football bowl games
2011
2011
2011
2011 in sports in Idaho
December 2011 sports events in the United States